Sporck is a surname. Notable people with the surname include:

 August Geelmuyden Spørck (1851–1928), Norwegian military officer and politician 
 Charles E. Sporck (born 1928), American engineer and industrialist 
 Franz Anton von Sporck (1662–1738), Central European cultural figure
 Johann von Sporck (1595–1679), German nobleman and military leader
 Jørgen Fredrik Spørck (1787–1866), Norwegian military officer and politician